Andrew Finlay (born 10 February 1901; date of death unknown) was a Scottish footballer who played as a forward for Port Vale, Airdrieonians, Manchester City, Crewe Alexandra, Third Lanark, Dundee United and Hibernian in the 1920s.

Career
Finlay played for Glasgow-based junior club Shawfield before joining English Second Division side Port Vale in September 1921. His only appearance at The Old Recreation Ground was at outside-left in a 1–1 draw against South Shields on 22 October, and he was released at the end of the 1921–22 season. He later played for Airdrieonians, Manchester City, Crewe Alexandra, Third Lanark, and Dundee United, before joining Hibernian midway through the 1926–27 season. He scored three goals in 19 First Division games in the 1927–28 season, and then bagged four goals in 33 appearances in the 1928–29 campaign before leaving Easter Road.

Career statistics
Source:

References

Footballers from Glasgow
Scottish footballers
Association football forwards
Port Vale F.C. players
Airdrieonians F.C. (1878) players
Manchester City F.C. players
Crewe Alexandra F.C. players
Third Lanark A.C. players
Dundee United F.C. players
Hibernian F.C. players
English Football League players
Scottish Football League players
1901 births
Year of death missing
Shawfield F.C. players
Scottish Junior Football Association players